Paul Diel (11 July 1893 – 5 January 1972) was a French psychologist of Austrian origin who developed the method of introspective analysis and the psychology of motivation.

Life

Diel was born in Vienna, Austria, on 11 July 1893, to a teacher of German origin and an unknown man.  He was orphaned at the age of 13 after spending 8 years in a religious orphanage, but was able to obtain his baccalauréat with the support of a benefactor.  Diel did not pursue formal higher education, but instead became an actor, novelist, and poet before teaching himself philosophy.  Inspired by the philosophers Plato, Kant and Spinoza, and also by the psychologists Freud, Adler and Jung, he delved into his own psychological research and established the basis of the introspective analysis method that helped him develop his theories of the psychology of motivation.

Diel practiced psychotherapy at the central hospital of Vienna, and in 1935 he sent his work on introspective analysis to Albert Einstein.  Einstein greatly appreciated Diel's work and they established a correspondence that did not end until Einstein's death in 1955.

In 1938, after the Nazi German Anschluss of Austria, Diel escaped to France and worked at the Sainte-Anne psychiatric hospital in Paris. Unfortunately, because he was a foreign national, he became imprisoned in the Gurs internment camp in southern France during World War II.  After his release, he was able to join CNRS in 1945 with the backing of Einstein and Irène Joliot-Curie.  At CNRS he worked as a children's psychotherapist in Henri Wallon's laboratory.

Diel continued working as a researcher and psychotherapist and had trained a group of students and published books on various subjects like education, symbolism and evolution when he died of cancer in Paris on 5 January 1972.

Further reading

Works

Diel, P. (1989). Fear and Anxiety: Primary Triggers of Survival and Evolution (B. Donvez, Trans.). Claremont, CA: Hunter House. .
Diel, P. (1986). The God-Symbol: Its History and its Significance (N. Marans, Trans.). San Francisco: Harper & Row. .
Diel, P. (1987). Journal of a Psychoanalysis (R. Gravel, Trans.). Boston: Shambhala. .
Diel, P. (1991). The Psychology of Motivation (Paul Diel Society, Trans.). Claremont, CA: Hunter House. .
Diel, P. (1987). The Psychology of Re-education (R. Rosenthal, Trans.). Boston/New York: Shambhala/Random House. .
Diel, P. (1992). Psychology, Psychoanalysis, and Medicine (K. McKinley, Trans.). Alameda, CA: Hunter House. .
Diel, P. (1980). Symbolism in Greek Mythology: Human Desire and its Transformations (V. Stuart, M. Stuart & R. Folkman, Trans.). Boulder/New York: Shambhala/Random House.  & .
Diel, P. (1986). Symbolism in the Bible: The Universality of Symbolic Language and its Psychological Significance (N. Marans, Trans.). San Francisco: Harper & Row. .

Co-authored works

Diel, P, & Solotareff, J. (1988). Symbolism in the Gospel of John (N. Marans, Trans.). San Francisco: Harper & Row. .

Related works

Solotareff, J. (1991). L'aventure interieure: La methode introspective de Paul Diel. Paris: Editions Payot. .
Solotareff, J. (1994). Le symbolisme dans les rêves: La méthode de traduction de Paul Diel. Paris: Editions Payot. .
Solotareff, J. (2004). Une lecture symbolique des Évangiles: Selon la méthode introspective de Paul Diel. Paris: Editions du Cerf. .

External links
 The Association for Introspective Psychology
 The Association of the Psychology of Motivation 
 Correspondence between Diel and Einstein in the Albert Einstein Archives at the Jewish National & University Library, the Hebrew University of Jerusalem

References
405-2.1 Paul Diel. (n.d.). Retrieved May 8, 2004, from https://web.archive.org/web/20041215113609/http://news.taovillage.com/news/site_arbos/arbo/405surquoicompter/405-2.1PaulDiel.htm.
FirstSearch [OCLC - Reference]. (n.d.). Retrieved May 8, 2004, from http://www.oclc.org/firstsearch/.
Site of the Association for Introspective Psychoanalysis. (n.d.). Retrieved May 8, 2004, from http://perso.wanadoo.fr/introspective.psychology.

1893 births
1972 deaths
French psychologists
People from Vienna in health professions
French male non-fiction writers
20th-century French psychologists
20th-century French philosophers
Gurs internment camp survivors
20th-century French male writers
Austrian emigrants to France